= Super SmartJoy =

Super Nintendo Entertainment System accessory

- Manufacturer: SmartJoy
- Type: Super Nintendo Entertainment System (SNES) accessory

The Super SmartJoy is a device that allows Super NES controllers to be used with a computer. The device was announced on April 20, 2004. This device has a USB port for connecting to both Windows PCs and Macs. SmartJoy is the manufacturer of this peripheral.

Multiple devices can be used on one computer for multiplayer gaming.
